Marull is a surname. Notable people with the surname include:

José Presas y Marull (?-1842) Catalonia attorney, writer, politician, diplomat and historian 
Laia Marull (born 1973), Spanish actress
Narciso Marull (1747-c.1820), Spanish apothecary and merchant